The 2022 ACC women's basketball tournament concluded the 2021–22 season of the Atlantic Coast Conference, and was held at Greensboro Coliseum in Greensboro, North Carolina from March 2–6, 2022.  This is the 22nd time in 23 years that the tournament has been held in Greensboro. The NC State Wolfpack claimed the title of ACC Champion and an automatic berth into the NCAA tournament for the third year in a row.

Seeds

All 15 ACC teams are scheduled to participate in the tournament.  Teams are seeded by record within the conference, with a tiebreaker system to seed teams with identical conference records. The top four seeds will receive double byes, while seeds 5 through 9 will receive single byes.  NC State finished as regular season champions and received the first seed after their final day victory over Virginia Tech.

Schedule

Bracket

Source:

* – Denotes overtime period

Game summaries

First round

Second round

Quarterfinals

Semifinals

Final

All-Tournament Teams

See also 
 2022 ACC men's basketball tournament

References 

2021–22 Atlantic Coast Conference women's basketball season
ACC women's basketball tournament
Basketball competitions in Greensboro, North Carolina
ACC Women's Basketball
Women's sports in North Carolina